Hertford College Boat Club (HCBC) is a rowing club for members of Hertford College, Oxford. It is based in the Longbridges boathouse on the Isis, which is owned by the college and shared with St Hilda's, St Catz, Green Templeton, and Mansfield.

The club was affiliated with Templeton College until 2008, when the latter merged to form a new college, Green Templeton College with its own boat club.

History

The Early Days of the Boat Club

The years after the re-foundation of the College were among the golden years of the college boat club. Hertford College was in 1874 re-founded as the new embodiment of Magdalen Hall, which was absorbed by it - (all its members being incorporated, and its buildings occupied by Hertford College). The 'Blue-Black' of the Hall had, as far as O.U.B.C. races are concerned, disappeared from the river in 1873 when their Eight was bumped over two places by Worcester College. The new Boat Club was really properly started in October 1875, when the first Captain (A. F. Thornhill) was elected - and the new colours (crimson and white) of the College made their appearance on the River in the following term when the first Torpid was put on. The debut gave some promise but was not very successful as having to change a man in the middle of the races the boat lost the two places it had gained - and here one may remark that one is at loss to account for the want of success which has always attended our Torpids, only one of them ever having risen, while the Eight has gone steadily from 20th to Head of the River in 1881. In this last Eight there were first hands recruited from the Torpid. The first Eight made its appearance in May 1876, and rose four places. After this we have only to chronicle success. The Eight starting nineteenth in 1878, rose in that year six places to thirteenth - in 1879 five places to eighth - in 1880 three places to fifth - and in 1881 with five new hands when everything looked worst we rose the remaining four places 'Head of the River'.

Through the energy of the Principal (Dr. Boyd) the College in November, 1878, became possessors of a Barge, which no doubt has been very conductive to our success. As to financial matters one cannot speak with so much pleasure and satisfaction for up till quite a recent date the College has not really been large enough to support its success which has entailed a somewhat heavy expenditure. But as the College has grown considerably and as efforts have been and are being made to clear off the debt that remains, it is hoped that we shall soon be able to speak of the Club as a financial success.

One consequence of being Head of the River in 1881 was that Hertford burnt its boats. The following letter was sent to T. G. Jackson, whilst he was engaged on the restoration of the Bodleian Library. It was sent by Mr Madden, sub-librarian:

Recent years

1997 saw the opening of new Longbridges boathouse, which replaced the older boathouse on the same site.

The club room is the ideal place to get a sense of the history of the club: adorning the walls are the names of former club captains and presidents, former blues (those who have represented Oxford against Cambridge in The Boat Race, or the Henley Boat Races, and 'champions', the most notable of whom is Paul Mattick, who as part of the GB Lightweight Men's 4- crew, won gold in an extremely tight race at the 2010 World Rowing Championships in New Zealand. He was previously a world champion in the same boat class in 2007, and finished 5th in the Olympic final in Beijing. Paul began rowing at Hertford and maintains strong ties to the boat club, continuing to have a coaching input.

The club is also immensely proud of Steph Cullen and Zoe Lee, both of whom also learnt to row at Hertford and who have gone on to represent Great Britain. Steph became World Champion in the women's lightweight quadruple sculls event, while Zoe is currently a member of the women's eight.

The years since the construction of the boat house have been highly successful with both the men's and women's sides achieving numerous sets of blades (bumping up on every day of Torpids or Summer Eights). The most recent of these occurred in 2015, when both the men's and women's first eights won blades in Torpids (a first in the college's history).

The Fire

On Monday 4 July 2005 the Longbridges Boathouse that accommodates Hertford and several other college boat clubs was damaged by fire. In an incident that the police identified as arson, the building was undamaged, but twenty-six boats were destroyed by the heat of the fire. The boat storage area as well as two clubrooms suffered severe smoke damage.

Upon investigation the cause of the fire was attributed to incendiary devices which had been placed in the boat bays. Responsibility for the fire was claimed by members of the Oxford Arson Squad via the ALF's group website. The fire wiped out the entire fleet of eights, including the newly acquired Women's Filippi; however, the small boats, stored in a different bay, were undamaged. Insurance cover allowed the club to replace all the destroyed boats with ones of equal or greater quality.

Facilities

Boat Fleet

The boat club maintains and aims to buy a new eight every three years.

Men's Boats
Empacher K86 8+ (2009)
Janousek 8+ (2005)
Aylings 8+
Filippi F19 4+ (2010)
Janousek 4+

Women's Boats
KIRS 17.2 8+ (2011)
Janousek 8+ (2005)
Janousek 8+
Stelph 4+/x (2005)

Shared
Lola Aylings 2x/-
Filippi 1x (2007)
ERB 1x
Stelph 1x
Janousek 1x

Erg Room

The club has access to the impressive Longbridges boat house erg room containing 8 Concept 2 Model D ergs (and sliders) and 4 refurbished Concept 2 Model C ergs, with large mirrors lining one wall so that you can see and improve your technique. In addition, the club also owns four Concept 2 Model C ergs and a Rowperfect machine which are located in the club room.

Club Room

Above the boat bays is a large club room overlooking the Isis, used for land training and social events. Adjoining this space are changing and showering facilities for men and women and a kitchen/bar area.

Hertford Rowing Bursary

The Hertford College Boat Club rowing bursaries are awards of up to £1000 a year for the students of the college who do the most to promote Hertford rowing. They are open to male and female, graduate and undergraduate students.

Society

Hertford has a strong rowing history, and this is reflected by the active role that the boat club society plays in the running of the club. Open to anyone with an interest or connection with Hertford rowing, the society is a growing organisation. The highlight of the year is the AGM. This is followed by the annual Society boat race, pitting past rowers against the current 1st VIII's, and then a formal dinner in Hall. Society members also receive the "Blades" magazine. This is published several times a year and keeps society members up to date with the recent fortunes of the club.

Honours

Henley Royal Regatta

See also
Oxford University Boat Club

References 

Bibliography
Buckin, E. Secretary's Book, Oxford: Hertford College
Goudie, Andrew (1984). Seven Hundred Years of an Oxford College (Hertford College 1284-1984), Oxford: Hertford College.

External links

Oxford Bumps Charts

Rowing clubs of the University of Oxford
Hertford College, Oxford
1875 establishments in England
Sports clubs established in 1875
Rowing clubs in Oxfordshire
Rowing clubs of the River Thames